Erina High School is a government-funded co-educational comprehensive secondary day school, located in , a suburb on the Central Coast of New South Wales, Australia.

Established in 1964, the school enrolled approximately 720 students in 2018, from Year 7 to Year 12, of whom eight percent identified as Indigenous Australians and eight percent were from a language background other than English. The school is operated by the New South Wales Department of Education; the principal is Karen Nicol.

Notable alumni 
Matt Orfordformer professional rugby league footballer
Dan Sarooshi a London-based barrister (Queen's Counsel) and Oxford professor of international law
Jamie Mullarkeylightweight mixed martial artist who competes for the Ultimate Fighting Championship.

See also 

 List of government schools in New South Wales
 Education in Australia

References

External links 
 Erina High School website
NSW Schools website

Central Coast (New South Wales)
Public high schools in New South Wales
Educational institutions established in 1964
1964 establishments in Australia